"Mitt i ett äventyr" is a song written by Stephan Berg, and performed by Carola Häggkvist at Melodifestivalen 1990, where the song ended up second, 15 points after Edin-Ådahl with "Som en vind". During Carola Häggkvist's the Nacka transmitter was knocked out. Urban rumors told about sabotage, since Carola Häggkvist had joined Christian denomination Livets ord.

The single peaked at number five on the Swedish Singles Chart. The song stayed at Svensktoppen for 10 weeks during the period of 21 April-25 August 1990, peaking at number three.

The song also entered Trackslistan.

In 1990, the song was also recorded by Curt Haagers for the album "Curt Haagers 10".

Charts

References

1990 singles
1990 songs
Melodifestivalen songs of 1990
Swedish-language songs
Carola Häggkvist songs
Curt Haagers songs
Mariann Grammofon singles
Songs written by Stephan Berg